Origin recognition complex subunit 6 is a protein that in humans is encoded by the ORC6 (ORC6L) gene.

Background
The origin recognition complex (ORC) is a highly conserved six subunit protein complex essential for the initiation of the DNA replication in eukaryotic cells. Studies in yeast demonstrated that ORC binds specifically to origins of replication and serves as a platform for the assembly of additional initiation factors such as Cdc6 and Mcm proteins.

Function
The protein encoded by this gene is a subunit of the ORC complex. It has been shown that this protein and ORC1 are loosely associated with the core complex consisting of ORC2, -3, -4 and -5. Gene silencing studies with small interfering RNA demonstrated that this protein plays an essential role in coordinating chromosome replication and segregation with cytokinesis.

Interactions
ORC6 has been shown to interact with MCM5, ORC2, Replication protein A1, ORC4, DBF4, ORC3, CDC45-related protein, MCM4 and Cell division cycle 7-related protein kinase.

References

Further reading

External links 
 PDBe-KB provides an overview of all the structure information available in the PDB for Human Origin recognition complex (ORC6)